Convoi de la liberté (English: "freedom convoy") may refer to one of two protests against restrictions relating to the COVID-19 pandemic, including:

 Canada convoy protest
 France convoy protest